Domenico Ciampoli (23 August 1852 in Atessa – 21 March 1929 in Rome) was an Italian writer and Slavist, best remembered for his writings on verism, particularly his short stories Fiori de monte (1876), Fiabe abruzzesi (1880), Racconti abruzzesi (1880), Trecce nere (1882) and Cicuta (1884), his novels L'ignoto (1884), Roccamarina (1890), L'invinsibile (1896), and Il Barone di San Giorgio (1897), and his Slavic publications Melodie Russe (1881), and Studi Slavi and Letterature slave (1889–1890).

References 

1852 births
1929 deaths
Italian writers
Italian novelists
Slavists